Barot House is a 2019 Bollywood Psychological thriller film about an upper middle-class Indian family caught in the whirlwind of murder and crime. The film was released through Zee5 on 7 August 2019.

Plot 
Amit Barot, the patriarch of the Barot House, lives in a serene neighbourhood in Daman with his family consisting of his wife, mother, and 4 children – a son and 3 daughters.

Suddenly, on Diwali, one of the daughters, Shreya, goes missing while playing hide and seek. After one day, her body is found at a graveyard. Amit's younger brother Ajay and their neighbor Anthony are suspected for the murder of Shreya. Soon after, the second daughter of the house also dies, and the police suspect Ajay.

Both Amit and Bhavana become emotionally drained and Amit starts suspecting his son Malhar for the death of his daughters after he apparently tried to drown his baby sister Sneha while playing, who was saved by Amit. Malhar even admits it when Amit violently questions him.

One day Anthony's son Roshan is murdered and Amit tries to hang Malhar to save everyone but he couldn't. The police questions Amit for Roshan's murder and Amit says that Malhar is the murderer. Malhar also accepts it.

Malhar then admits to the juvenile home. A psychologist questions him to find the fact and fails. He is reluctant to see his father also. They find scars on the boys back, and when he asks to draw something, he draws pictures of his father murdering the children with him watching it from a distance. But he throws away those drawings and shows one in which he plays tabla. The psychologist finds the drawings in the dustbin after watching Malhar through CCTV and believes that his father is the killer and Malhar tried to save his father because he worships him.

The police questions the family again and it is revealed that Amit and Anthony's wife Sophia suspects Bhavana and Anthony being in infidelity and Amit always believed that Shreya and Shruti are Anthony's daughters. The police arrests Amit and releases Malhar. Amit tries to attack the boy, and because of this the police thinks he did all the killings. Amit's wife also does not believe him.

After few days, while Bhavana is upstairs, Malhar throws little Sneha into the well which Bhavana witnesses from upstairs and screams. In an epilogue, Amit is released from jail and Malhar arrested again. Amit and Bhavana adopt 3 daughters and name them Shreya, Shruti and Sneha. They move out of Barot house and never see Malhar after that. It is assumed that Malhar has schizophrenia, he was very cunning for his age to lead the psychologists to believe that he is innocent, without uttering a word. He even knew that he has been watched through CCTV. Malhar never explained the reason behind the brutal murders.

Cast
 Amit Sadh as Amit Barot
 Manjari Fadnis as Bhavana Barot
 Aaryan Menghji as Malhar Barot
 Aseem Hattangadi as Anthony D'Souza
 Farida Patel Venkat as Pramila Patel
 Kiearra Soni as Shreya Barot
 Kishaa Arora as Shruti Barot
Alefia Kapadia

References

External links
 

2019 films
ZEE5 original films
Indian thriller drama films
2019 direct-to-video films